Heyworth is a village in McLean County, Illinois,  United States. It was founded in 1859. As of the 2020 census, Heyworth had a population of 2,791. It is part of the Bloomington–Normal Metropolitan Statistical Area.

History
Heyworth was laid out by Campbell Wakefield on September 11, 1859. Before settlement, the locality now known as Heyworth was covered by a heavy growth of timber and underbrush which was inhabited by the Kickapoo Native Americans, and supported a great number of deer, wild turkeys, and packs of large gray wolves.

As settlers began to move West, families such as the Rutledges, Funks, Passwaters, Bishops, Nobles, Wakefields, and Martins settled in the immediate vicinity of the present village of Heyworth as early as 1824. Campbell Wakefield was the primary founder of Heyworth. In the course of his achievements, Wakefield became the owner of a vast tract of land including what is now Heyworth.

As the population of the region increased and industries began to spring up, railroads were becoming a great advantage. In 1852 and 1853, the Illinois Central Railroad was constructed through the Wakefield land. When the line became operational in 1855, the residents hoped to put a train station in the vicinity. Many property owners vied for the station, but Wakefield immediately donated a large tract of land for the station. Additionally he set aside adjacent land for the foundation of a town, a Presbyterian church, and a district school.

The first post office was built in the municipality in 1856, when the new station was opened. The station was named "Elmwood", but it was soon discovered that this name was already taken by a locality in Peoria County. The president of the Illinois Central Railroad proposed calling the new station "Heyworth", after Lawrence Heyworth, an English director of the railroad.

After the establishment of the station, Campbell Wakefield made several donations to encourage trade and induce businessmen to locate in the new town. He became the proprietor of the new town, and the village of Heyworth was incorporated on March 31, 1869.

Geography
Heyworth is in southern McLean County and is served by two U.S. highways. U.S. Route 51 passes through the west side of Heyworth as a four-lane divided highway, leading north  to Bloomington, the county seat, and south the same distance to Clinton. U.S. Route 136 passes through the village center, leading east  to Rantoul and west  to McLean.

Kickapoo Creek passes through the western part of the village, flowing southwest to Salt Creek and then the Sangamon River, a tributary of the Illinois River.

Demographics

As of the census of 2007, there were 2,547 people,(+3.1% from 2000), 898 households, and 687 families residing in the village. The racial makeup of the village was 97.82% White, 0.16% African American, 0.08% Native American, 0.37% Asian, 0.62% from other races, and 0.95% from two or more races. Hispanic or Latino of any race were 0.82% of the population.

There were 898 households, out of which 42.8% had children under the age of 18 living with them, 65.0% were married couples living together, 8.2% had a female householder with no husband present, and 23.4% were non-families. 19.3% of all households were made up of individuals, and 9.9% had someone living alone who was 65 years of age or older. The average household size was 2.71 and the average family size was 3.12.

In the village, the population was spread out, with 31.0% under the age of 18, 6.1% from 18 to 24, 33.0% from 25 to 44, 19.3% from 45 to 64, and 10.6% who were 65 years of age or older. The median age was 33 years. For every 100 females, there were 95.3 males. For every 100 females age 18 and over, there were 91.9 males.

The median income for a household in the village was $53,043, and the median income for a family was $60,648. Males had a median income of $40,944 versus $26,708 for females. The per capita income for the village was $20,655. About 2.9% of families and 3.1% of the population were below the poverty line, including 2.8% of those under age 18 and 2.0% of those age 65 or over.

Economy and services 

Community services include local police protection, a volunteer fire department, local 24-hour ambulance service which will soon have paid paramedics on staff, local schools from kindergarten through grade 12, and several churches of various denominations. The annual Hey Days celebration in May features a carnival, food and live entertainment. Christmas is celebrated with the "Holidays Heyworth Style" parade and craft show.

OSF Primary Care, a medical clinic operated by the OSF Healthcare System under the auspices of OSF St. Joseph's Medical Center in Bloomington, opened in January 2010. The facility provides in-town healthcare access to Heyworth residents for the first time since 1989.

Schools
Heyworth Elementary School services grades Pre K - 6.  The school is located at 100 S. Joselyn St.

Heyworth Jr/Sr High School services grades 7 - 12.  The school is located at 308 W. Cleveland St. The Junior High offers the following sports for students: Basketball, Baseball, Softball, Volleyball, Track and Wrestling.  The Senior High offers the following sports and activities for students: Basketball, Football, Golf, Soccer, Volleyball, Baseball, Softball, Track, Cheerleading, Marching Band, Speech, Wrestling, and FFA.

References

Marker, Charles A., (1926) A History of Heyworth, The Heyworth Star. Read the complete text here

External links

Heyworth School District #4

Villages in McLean County, Illinois
Villages in Illinois
Populated places established in 1859
1858 establishments in Illinois